Ananda Sukarlan-Gomez (born in Jakarta, 10 June 1968) is an Indonesian-Spanish classical composer and pianist.

Background
He is the son of Sukarlan and Poppy Kumudastuti. He started his music lessons at the age of 5 from his older sister, Martani Widjajanti. After graduating from Kolese Kanisius (Canisius College, Jakarta) in 1986, he then went to Europe when he was 17, graduated with summa cum laude in 1993 from the Royal Conservatory of The Hague under the guidance of Naum Grubert and was a prize winner of many international competitions, such as the Nadia Boulanger Award of Orleans. He has performed in many overseas festivals with symphony orchestras and ensembles of Berlin, Rotterdam, nearly all symphony orchestras in Spain, Paris, Wellington as well as appearances in radios and TVs throughout Europe. He was the first Indonesian artist who established the cultural relationship between Portugal and Indonesia by performing as a soloist with the Portuguese National Symphony Orchestra in 2000, right after the re-opening of the diplomatic relationship between the two countries. He is the only Indonesian listed in the book "2000 outstanding musicians of the 20th century" and "The International Who's Who in Music" published by Cambridge. Until the beginning of 2010 he has recorded 14 CDs, which include the complete piano works of Santiago Lanchares, David del Puerto, Jesus Rueda, Toru Takemitsu as well as works by Peter Sculthorpe, Amir Pasaribu, Trisutji Kamal, Theo Loevendie and of course himself.

As an equally successful composer, his works have been commissioned and performed by the Associated Board of Royal Schools of Music, Indonesian Opera Society, among others. His collaboration with prominent choreographer Chendra Panatan has given birth to many works for ballet, performed both in Europe and Indonesia. His groundbreaking opera written for one soprano only, based on a monologue by Seno Gumira Ajidarma, "IBU -- yang anaknya diculik itu" (Mother, whose son had been kidnapped) was just premiered in June 2009 in Jakarta. Until now he has written works for orchestra and instruments, but it is his production for voices, such as his more than 150 songs for voice and piano, choral works, 2 operas, 2 cantatas ("Ars Amatoria" and "LIBERTAS") and theatre works that consolidated his high reputation as a composer by being frequently performed all around the world. Other celebrated chamber / solo works include the string quartet "Lontano" for Midori Goto and her quartet, a guitar solo piece for Miguel Trapaga, many works for piano solo (a series of Rapsodia Nusantara based on Indonesia folk melodies, a series of virtuosic Etudes, and 37 easy piano pieces compiled as "Alicia's piano book") and multiple pianos. Projects in 2014 include his third opera, "Clara". He is also working on a series of musical works written for disabled musicians, on a commission by Fundacion Musica Abierta of Spain.

His works have been the object of studies for many doctoral thesis and other musical researches by many students, professionals, musicians and musicologists in the U.S, Europe and Australia.

He is a founding member of Musica Presente and of Yayasan Musik Sastra Indonesia.

Although a Muslim himself Ananda is highly critical of Jakarta governor Anies Baswedan, whom he accuses of pandering to Islam extremists. When Baswedan showed up at a college reunion, Ananda chose to leave the room, an activity that he did spontaneously without asking anyone to follow what he did, as a declaration of his own views and morals. Hundreds of alumni, sharing the same views and moral conviction as Ananda also chose to leave the room with their own will. Unlike what most media reported, some attendants and alumni stayed until the end of Baswedan's speech.

His main residence at hills of Cantabria Santander, Spain.

Honours and awards
 1988, Amsterdam, Eduard Elipse Award in Netherlands National Music Competition.
 1993 First Prize "Nadia Boulanger" — Concours International d’Orleans (Orleans, France, 1993).
 1993 First Prize "Xavier Montsalvatge" — Concurso de Musica del Siglo XX Xavier Montsalvatge, Ginora, Spain
 1994 First Prize "Blanquefort Piano Competition", Bordeaux, France
 1995 First Prize and Special Prize for The Best Interpreter of Spanish Music "City of Ferrol Piano Competition", Galicia, Spain
 1995 Second Prize "Sweelinck-Postbank", Amsterdam, The Netherlands
 1995 Third Prize "Fundacion Guerrero Competition", Madrid, Spain
 1996 Second Prize "Vienna Modern Master Performers Recording Award"
 2000 Outstanding Musicians on the 20th Century.
 2001 Nominee Unesco Prize
 2003 Mont Blanc Asia for his contribution for classical music industry in Indonesia
 The first Indonesian pianist who be written in The International Who's Who in Music book.

Compositions

Opera

 Pro Patria (for 6 soloists, men's choir, dancers and chamber orchestra) in 7 scenes, libretto by Sutan Takdir Alisjahbana adapted by Ananda Sukarlan, from his book "Kalah dan Menang"   150'
 Mengapa Kau Culik Anak Kami (for soprano & baritone soloists, 3 dancers & 9 instrumentalists)  in 2 acts, based on a play by Seno Gumira Ajidarma     80'
 Ibu—yang anaknya diculik itu (a "pocket opera" for soprano solo accompanied by piano + flute doubl. piccolo, both also playing small percussions instruments) based on a monologue by Seno Gumira Ajidarma—the sequel of "Mengapa Kau Culik Anak Kami". 35'

Cantata

 No. 1 Ars Amatoria (for soprano & baritone soloists, children's and men's choir, 2 dancers and 4 instrumentalists, conducted by the pianist) based on poems by Sapardi Djoko Damono 35'
 No. 2 Libertas (for baritone soloist & mixed choir, accompanied by 8 instrumentalists. There is also a version for a symphony orchestra as the accompaniment) based on poems by Chairil Anwar, Ilham Malayu, Sapardi Djoko Damono, Walt Whitman, Luis Cernuda, WS Rendra, Hasan Aspahani 27'

Choir (a cappella)

 Jokpiniana No. 1, for SSAATTBB 4'
 Kita Ciptakan Kemerdekaan, for SSATBarB (from the cantata LIBERTAS) 3'30
 Para Papa Mozart, for SSAATTBB 3'
 Psalm 148, for SSAATTBB 4'
 Parallel Madrigals (very short pieces for a cappella chamber choirs, each could be performed separately)
 Hei! Jangan Kau Patahkan, for 4-part children's choir
 A Hymn for the Olympic Sportsmen, for 4-part girls' choir

Orchestra (& soloist and/or Choir)
 Stanza Suara, for 6-part choir, orchestra and angklung
 Marzukiana Pianistica, 2 fantasies for piano & orchestra
 Marzukiana Violinistica, 2 fantasies for violin & orchestra
 The Voyage to Marege , for orchestra with flute concertante & optional didgeridoo
 The Arrival of Islam (part 2 from The Voyage to Marege'''), for flute concertante & orchestra with optional didgeridoo
 Love at the times of Srivijaya (from The Voyage to Marege, with different beginning & ending), for orchestra
 Wagner's Restless Nights, a short overture for piano & orchestra 
 Fons Juventatis, a short overture for piano & orchestra
 An Ode to The Nation, for tenor solo, children choir & orchestra (based on speeches by B.J. Habibie)
 Overture to Clara, for orchestra
 Overture to Tumirah, for orchestra

Chamber music

 Requiescat, for English horn & string quartet or string orchestra (Intermezzo from the cantata LIBERTAS) 5'
 Lontano, for string quartet (choreographic interlude from the opera "Mengapa Kau Culik Anak Kami") 5'
 Rescuing Ariadne, for flute & piano 6'30"
 Prelude and Intermezzo from the opera "Ibu", for flute & piano 6'
 Chamber music written for handicapped pianists (LH normal, RH only functioning with 2 fingers). Can be played by normal (intermediate level) pianists
 Someone's stolen her heart (and I found it), for viola & piano 3'
 The Sleepers, for violin & piano 3'
 Sweet Sorrow, for violin & piano
 Funfair Fanfare, for trumpet & piano 3'
 Nothing Gold can stay (Robert Frost), for soprano & piano 2'
 Daun Jati (S. Yoga), for baritone (with falsetti) & piano 2'
 The Pirates are Coming, for 1 pianist with only 2 fingers acc. by 1 pianist (both hands)

Piano(s)

 The Humiliation of Drupadi, for 2 pianos 6'
 Schumann's Psychosis, for 3 pianos 6 pianists 5'30"
 5 Etudes for Solo Piano Rapsodia Nusantara no. 1 - 10 (number still growing) for piano solo
 Just a Minute!, 13 pieces for left hand alone
 37 easy to moderately difficult pieces in "Alicia's First Piano Book"Vocal works (accompanied by piano otherwise indicated)

 Senyap Dalam Derai, 6 songs for soprano
 Gemuruhnya Malam, 4 songs for baritone
 Canda Empat Penjuru, 4 short songs (Autumn, Winter, Spring, Summer) for baritone
 A Untuk Akis, Alam dan Angkasa, 5 songs for baritone
 Ilham di Penjara, 3 songs for high voice
 Nyanyian Malam, 12 songs for medium voice
 Love and Variations, 8 songs for soprano & baritone duet
 Sajak 3 Bagian, for tenor and guitar
 Arias from the opera "Pro Patria"
 3 duets (soprano & baritone) from Cantata no. 1 "Ars Amatoria"
 Haikus (soprano, clarinet & cello) on haikus by Abang Edwin SA
 Bibirku Bersujud di bibirmu (soprano, fl/alt fl, violin, piano), a "choreographic essay" based on a poem by Hasan Aspahani 14'
 Two songs on poems by Walt Whitman, for medium-high voice & piano ("I sit and look out" and "Darkness and my lover"
 Two Sapardi songs for Binu, for medium voice

Solo Instruments

 Satria Sendiri, for bassoon solo (from the opera "Mengapa Kau Culik Anak Kami") 3'
 You had Me at Hello, 3 pieces for flute solo (choreographic intermezzi from the cantata "Ars Amatoria") 	7'
 The 5 Lovers of Drupadi, for guitar solo 5'30"
 3 Star Signs, for oboe solo (one of them is for circular breathing). each 1 - 2 mins
 Bachlindrome, for cello solo

Discography
 The Pentatonic Connection (Music influenced by Javanese & Balinese Gamelan)
 Complete Piano Works of 
 Trisutji Kamal: CD 1 from "Complete Piano Works series" : Elaborations of Indonesian Folkmelodies and Individual Works
 Trisutji Kamal (Complete Piano Works Series) : CD 2 Sunda Seascapes (7 pieces, 1990) & Music for Films (5 pieces).
 Jesus Rueda: Complete Works for Strings and piano (with the Arditti Quartet)
 Jesus Rueda: Works for piano & ensemble (including 2 piano concerti)
 Santiago Lanchares: Complete Piano Works
 Music on and off the Keys (music by Theo Loevendie etc.)
 Peter Sculthorpe: Spirits of Place (mostly piano music, and 2 Trios)
 David del Puerto: Symphony no. 2 "Nusantara" for piano & orchestra
 David del Puerto: Complete works for piano solo

References

External links
 Official website

Indonesian classical pianists
Indonesian classical composers
21st-century classical pianists
21st-century classical composers
University of Hartford alumni
Royal Conservatory of The Hague alumni
Indonesian Muslims
Indonesian expatriates in Spain
People from Jakarta
1968 births
Living people